Jeanne Moirod (1905, near Saint-Amour—1997) was a French Resistance member, principal liaison agent of Colonel Henri Romans-Petit's northern group, and mayor of Oyonnax from March to May 1953.

Biography 
She was a glassmaker, assistant to the Mayor of Oyonnax and a Trotskyist. Her house was the improvised hub of the Resistance in Jura; from this hub, newspapers were reproduced, Moirod found shelters and caches for the combatants and weapons in the mountains and she helped transport the guerrillas there. With her brother-in-law, Gabriel Jeanjacquot, Moirod helped to disseminate the journal, Bir-Hakeim, by journalist André Jacquelin.

In March 1953, she was elected mayor of Oyonnax, but remained in that position for just two months as elections were held on 26 April and 3 May 1953.

Awards 
 There is a Jeanne-Moirod square in Oyonnax.
 Jeanne Moirod is one of the six women who received the Resistance Medal.
 She is one of the few women who hold the Médaille militaire.

References 

1905 births
1997 deaths
French Resistance members
French political people
Women mayors of places in France
20th-century French women
People from Oyonnax
Recipients of the Resistance Medal
Recipients of the Médaille militaire (France)